Joseph Peter Sarro (born 27 January 2002) is an English professional cricketer who plays for Sussex County Cricket Club. Sarro is a right-handed batsman and a right-arm fast-medium bowler.

Educated at Bede's School,  Sarro studies business management at Loughborough University. He started playing for Sussex at the under-11s age group, signing his first professional contract for the team in April 2021.

He made his first-class debut on 6 May 2021 for Sussex against Northamptonshire in the 2021 County Championship at the County Cricket Ground, Northampton. He made his List A debut on 23 July 2021, for Sussex in the 2021 Royal London One-Day Cup.

References

External links

2002 births
Living people
English cricketers
Sussex cricketers
Sportspeople from Eastbourne